Guzmania gloriosa is a species of flowering plant in the Bromeliaceae family. It is native to Bolivia and Ecuador.

References

gloriosa
Flora of Bolivia
Flora of Ecuador
Taxa named by Carl Christian Mez
Taxa named by Édouard André